Inverell Hawks Rugby League Football Club is an Australian rugby league football club based in Inverell, New South Wales. They conduct teams for Juniors & Seniors.

Notable Juniors
Peter Ellis (1997-03 Sydney Roosters & St George Illawarra Dragons)
Owen Craigie (1995-00 Newcastle Knights, Wests Tigers & South Sydney Rabbitohs)
Peter Ellis (1997-03 Sydney Roosters & St George Illawarra Dragons)
Preston Campbell (1998-11 Cronulla Sharks, Penrith Panthers & Gold Coast Titans)
Phil Bailey (1999-10 Cronulla Sharks & Wigan Warriors)
Matt White (2005-16 Newcastle Knights, Gold Coast Titans & Melbourne Storm)
Chris Bailey (2006-15 Newcastle Knights, Manly Sea Eagles & London Broncos)
Bevan French (2016- Parramatta Eels & Wigan Warriors)

See also

References

External links

Rugby league teams in New South Wales
Rugby clubs established in 1965
1965 establishments in Australia